Giuseppe Incocciati (born November 16, 1963 in Fiuggi) is an Italian professional football coach and a former professional player who played as a forward. He is currently the manager of Atletico Terme Fiuggi.

Playing career
As a player, he played 7 seasons (139 games, 23 goals) in the Serie A for A.C. Milan, Atalanta B.C., Empoli F.C., Pisa Calcio and S.S.C. Napoli.

Managerial career
After a stint as youth coach of Cisco Roma, he was hired as Avellino head coach in 2008 for a short period.

He returned at Cisco Roma the following year, this time as head coach, with whom he won promotion to Lega Pro Prima Divisione by the end of the season. He resigned in April 2011, with the club (now named Atletico Roma) fighting for a promotion playoff spot.

He served as head coach of Martina Franca in 2015–16.

In July 2019, he was named new head coach of hometown Serie D club Atletico Terme Fiuggi.

Honours
Milan
 Mitropa Cup winner: 1982.

Napoli
 Supercoppa Italiana winner: 1990.

References

External links
FIGC Profile  
Photo

1963 births
Living people
Italian footballers
Italy under-21 international footballers
Serie A players
Serie B players
A.C. Milan players
Ascoli Calcio 1898 F.C. players
Atalanta B.C. players
Empoli F.C. players
Pisa S.C. players
S.S.C. Napoli players
Bologna F.C. 1909 players
Italian football managers
U.S. Avellino 1912 managers
Atletico Roma F.C. managers
Association football forwards